Karla Isabel Peniche Hernández (born April 17, 1988) is a Mexican TV actress, model and beauty pageant titleholder who won Miss Caraïbes Hibiscus 2015 in Saint Martin.

Karla is an actress in Televisa and graduated of CEA. She has been acting in different soap operas in Mexico as well as TV hostess known for Como dice el dicho (2011), Quiero amarte (2013) and Noches Con Platanito (2013).

She won the National Title of Rostro de México in 2014 and competed at Miss Global Beauty Queen in 2015 where she was a Semifinalist in the Top 15 winning Miss Congeniality and Miss Internet awards. Also she competed  at Miss Caraïbes Hibiscus pageant obtained the 2nd Place and the next year the organization give to her the title, becoming the first Mexican to win this Title (2015).

En 2016 participó en la serie Como dice el dicho como actriz invitada en algunos capítulos.

References

Living people
1989 births
Mexican female models
Mexican beauty pageant winners